Institut Saint-André is a French speaking Catholic free school ("ecole libre" - a subsidized state school in Belgium), situated in Ixelles, Brussels,  Belgium. Commonly called "Saint-André" by students, it is composed of two campuses. The primary and "maternelle" (preschool) share a site on Chaussée de Boondael, while the secondary school is found on the nearby Avenue de l'Hippodrome. The school follows the general curriculum, which includes French, Mathematics, Dutch, Science, History, Geography, Latin and Gymnastics. From  the third year of secondary school, Saint-André offers elective courses, with  a choice between Latin,  Science,  English, Business, and Classical Greek. Together, all  elective and general curriculum  subjects must make up 29 to 33 hours of tuition a week. The school was founded in 1906 as a boarding  school for girls. It is now a mixed school, open to applications from boys and girls.

External links
 Institut Saint-André website

Schools in Brussels